Ioxitalamic acid (brand name Telebrix) is a pharmaceutical drug used as an iodinated contrast medium for X-ray imaging. It is used in form of its salts, ioxitalamate sodium and ioxitalamate meglumine.

References 

Acetanilides
Benzamides
Benzoic acids
Monomers
Radiocontrast agents
Iodoarenes